Camden London Borough Council is the local authority for the London Borough of Camden in Greater London, England. It is a London borough council, one of 32 in the United Kingdom capital of London. Camden is divided into 18 wards, each electing three councillors.

Following the 2018 election Camden London Borough Council comprised 43 Labour Party councillors, 7 Conservative Party councillors, 3 Liberal Democrat councillors and one for the Green Party. One Labour councillor defected to the Greens in October 2021.

The council was created by the London Government Act 1963 and replaced three local authorities: Hampstead Metropolitan Borough Council, Holborn Metropolitan Borough Council and St Pancras Metropolitan Borough Council.

History
There have previously been a number of local authorities responsible for the Camden area. The current local authority was first elected in 1964, a year before formally coming into its powers and prior to the creation of the London Borough of Camden on 1 April 1965. Camden London Borough Council replaced Hampstead Metropolitan Borough Council, Holborn Metropolitan Borough Council and St Pancras Metropolitan Borough Council. All three had been created in 1900, in Hampstead and St Pancras the borough councils replaced the parish vestries, and in Holborn the metropolitan borough council replaced the Holborn District Board of Works and the St Giles District Board of Works.

It was envisaged that through the London Government Act 1963 Camden as a London local authority would share power with the Greater London Council. The split of powers and functions meant that the Greater London Council was responsible for "wide area" services such as fire, ambulance, flood prevention, and refuse disposal; with the local authorities responsible for "personal" services such as social care, libraries, cemeteries and refuse collection. This arrangement lasted until 1986 when Camden London Borough Council gained responsibility for some services that had been provided by the Greater London Council, such as waste disposal. Camden became an education authority in 1990. Since 2000 the Greater London Authority has taken some responsibility for highways and planning control from the council, but within the English local government system the council remains a "most purpose" authority in terms of the available range of powers and functions.

In 2012 it was revealed that Camden local authority has been permanently banned from accessing information from the Driver and Vehicle Licensing Agency. This information is normally made available to local authorities for purposes such as enforcing parking fines, but access can be withdrawn if they are found to be mis-using the service. The Big Brother Watch organisation, which obtained the information about the ban under a Freedom of Information request, claimed that "the public are right to be worried that their privacy is at risk across a range of government services."

Summary results of elections

Since 1964 political control of the council has been held by the following parties:

Powers and functions
The local authority derives its powers and functions from the London Government Act 1963 and subsequent legislation, and has the powers and functions of a London borough council. It sets council tax and as a billing authority also collects precepts for Greater London Authority functions and business rates. It sets planning policies which complement Greater London Authority and national policies, and decides on almost all planning applications accordingly.  It is a local education authority  and is also responsible for council housing, social services, libraries, waste collection and disposal, traffic, and most roads and environmental health.

Wards
Until the 2022 local elections, Camden's electoral wards were:

 Belsize
 Bloomsbury
 Camden Town with Primrose Hill
 Cantelowes
 Fortune Green
 Frognal and Fitzjohns
 Gospel Oak
 Hampstead Town
 Haverstock
 Highgate
 Holborn and Covent Garden
 Kentish Town
 Kilburn
 King's Cross
 Regent's Park
 St Pancras and Somers Town
 Swiss Cottage
 West Hampstead

The new wards from May 2022 are:

 Belsize
 Bloomsbury
 Camden Square
 Camden Town
 Fortune Green
 Frognal
 Gospel Oak
 Hampstead Town
 Haverstock
 Highgate
 Holborn and Covent Garden
 Kentish Town North
 Kentish Town South
 Kilburn
 King's Cross
 Primrose Hill
 Regent's Park
 South Hampstead
 St Pancras and Somers Town
 West Hampstead

Criticisms

Local employment imbalance 
Following Freedom of Information requests, it was discovered that only 16% of Camden's employees live within the borough, and that many of its employees live as far afield as Scotland and Northern Ireland.

It was also discovered that senior employees were more likely to live further away from Camden, with a spokesperson saying that finding employees with specialised skillsets near to the borough was 'almost impossible'. Camden stated in response that all their staff are provided with one day's extra leave for volunteering, with a 'focus on Camden'.

Statistics also showed that only a single employee lived in Camden's three Central London wards, despite comprising almost a quarter of the borough's size and population.

List of leaders

Leaders of the Council

Leaders of the Opposition

Chief Executives / Clerks

Notable councillors 

 Nasim Ali (Labour, Regents Park 2002–present), Leader of Camden London Borough Council 2010–12; Mayor of Camden 2003–04; first Bangladeshi and first Muslim mayor.
 Katherine Allen (Labour, Kilburn 1982–90), Director of Amnesty International UK (AIUK) 2000–21.
 Lucy Anderson (Labour, Kentish Town 2002–06), Member of the European Parliament (MEP) for the London region 2014–19.
 Richard Arthur (Labour, Bloomsbury 1971–74; Belsize 1974–76; Highgate 1990–2002), Leader of Camden London Borough Council 1993–2000; Camden and Islington NHS Foundation Trust 2009–13.
 Siobhan Baillie (Conservative, Frognal and Fitzjohns 2014–18),  Member of Parliament (MP) for Stroud since 2019.
 Hugh Bayley (Labour, Chalk Farm 1982–86), MP for York 1992–97; MP for City of York 1997–2010; MP for York Central 2010–15; Parliamentary Under-Secretary of State for Social Security 1999–2001; Deputy Speaker of the House of Commons First Deputy Chair of Ways and Means 2010; President of the NATO Parliamentary Assembly 2012–14.
 Siân Berry (Green, Highgate 2014–present), Member of the London Assembly (AM) since 2016, Co-Leader of the Green Party of England and Wales 2018–2021.
 Geoffrey Bindman QC (Hon) (Labour, St Johns 1971–74), Chair of the British Institute of Human Rights since 2005.
 Nicholas Bosanquet (Labour, Camden 1974–82), British health economist; Chair of the Fabian Society 1974–75.
 Edward Bowman (Conservative, Alderman 1964–74), MEP for Lancashire East 1979–84; MEP for Hampshire Central 1988–94; MEP for Itchen, Test and Avon 1994–99.
 Peter Brooke CH, PC (Conservative, Highgate 1968–69), MP for City of London and Westminster South 1977–97; Cities of London and Westminster 1997–2001; Chairman of the Conservative Party 1987–89; Paymaster General 1987–89; Secretary of State for Northern Ireland 1989–92; Secretary of State for National Heritage 1992–94.
 Leila Campbell (Labour, Priory 1965–68; Alderman 1971–78), Chair of the Inner London Education Authority (ILEA) 1977–78; Vice Chair 1967–77.
 Raj Chada (Labour, Gospel Oak 2002–06), Leader of Camden London Borough Council 2005–06.
 Pamela Chesters (Conservative, Frognal 1994–2001), Leader of the Opposition on Camden London Borough Council 1998–2000; Advisor for Health and Youth Opportunities to the Mayor of London, Boris Johnson 2009–12; Chair of Central London Community Healthcare NHS Trust 2012–16; Chair of Anchor Trust 2013–18.
 Adrian Cohen (Labour, Hampstead Town 2022), founder of London Jewish Forum.
 Oliver Cooper (Conservative, Hampstead Town 2015–22), Leader of the Opposition on Camden London Borough Council 2018–22.
 Frank Dobson (Labour, Holborn 1971–76); Leader of Camden London Borough Council 1973–75; MP for Holborn and St Pancras South 1979–83; MP for Holborn and St Pancras 1983–2015; Secretary of State for Health 1997–99.
 Peggy Duff (Labour, Camden 1965–68), the first General Secretary of the Campaign for Nuclear Disarmament (CND).
 Geoffrey Finsberg (Conservative, Hampstead Central 1964–71; West End 1971–74), MP for Hampstead 1970–83 and Hampstead & Highgate 1983–92.
 Samuel Fisher (Labour, St Pancras 1964–71; Alderman 1971–78), Mayor of Stoke Newington 1953–54; Chairman of Camden London Borough Council shadow authority 1964; first Mayor of Camden 1965–66; last chairman of the Metropolitan Water Board 1973–74; Board of Deputies of British Jews 1973–79.
 Neil Fletcher (Labour, Kilburn 1978–82), last Leader of the Inner London Education Authority (ILEA) 1979–90.
 Simon Fletcher (Labour, St Pancras 1993–94), political strategist and campaigner.
 Sally Gimson (Labour, Highgate 2011–18).
 Andrew Gordon-Saker (Conservative, Bloomsbury 1982–86), Senior Costs Judge of England and Wales since 2014.
 Georgia Gould (Labour, Kentish Town 2010–22; Kentish Town South 2022–present), Leader of Camden London Borough Council since 2017.
 Alan Greengross (Conservative, Holborn 1964–71; Alderman 1970–74; Hampstead Town 1974–78; Frognal 1978–90), the final leader of the Conservative Party on the Greater London Council 1983–86; Director South West Trains 2001–07.
 Sarah Hayward (Labour, King's Cross 2010–18), Leader of Camden London Borough Council 2012–17.
 Roger Jowell CBE (Labour, Alderman 1971–78), Founder Social and Community Planning Research.
 Tessa Jowell DBE, PC (Labour, Swiss Cottage 1971–74; Gospel Oak 1974–86), MP for Dulwich 1992–97; MP for Dulwich and West Norwood 1997–2015; Minister of State (Minister for Public Health) 1997–99; Minister for Women 1998–2001 and 2005–06; Minister of State (Minister for Employment, Welfare to Work and Equal Opportunities) 1999–2001; Secretary of State for Culture, Media and Sport 2001–07; Minister for the Olympics 2005–10; Paymaster General 2007–10; Minister for London 2007–08 and 2009–10; Minister for the Cabinet Office 2009–10.
 Elaine Kellett DBE (Conservative, Alderman 1968–74), MEP for Cumbria 1979–84; MP for Lancaster 1970–97.
 Tony Kerpel (Conservative, Swiss Cottage 1974–78; Belsize 1978–86), Personal assistant to Prime Minister Edward Heath; special adviser to Conservative Chairman Kenneth Baker 1986–92; adviser to South African State President F. W. de Klerk 1993–94; Leader of the Opposition on Camden London Borough Council 1981–85.
 Claire-Louise Leyland (Conservative, Belsize 2010–18), Leader of the Opposition on Camden London Borough Council 2014–18.
 Nathalie Lieven DBE (Labour, Somers Town 1994–98), Judge of the High Court, Family Division since 2019.
 Ken Livingstone (Labour, Kilburn 1978–82), Member of the Greater London Council (GLC) 1973–86; Leader of the GLC 1981–86; MP Brent East 1987–2001; Mayor of London 2000–08 (Independent 2000–04, Labour 2004–08).
 Archie Macdonald (Conservative, Hampstead Town 1971–76), Liberal MP for Roxburgh and Selkirk 1950–51.
 Angela Mason (Labour, Cantelowes 2010–22), Chairman of The Fawcett Society since 2007; Director of Stonewall 1992–2002.
 Millie Miller (Labour, Euston 1964–68; Alderman 1968–71; Grafton 1971–74), MP for Ilford North 1974–77, Leader of Camden London Borough Council 1971–73 and the first woman to lead a London Borough council.
 David Mills (Labour, Belsize 1974–78).
 John Mills (Labour, Regents Park 1971–85; Gospel Oak 1990–2006), founder of British consumer products company JML (John Mills Limited).
 Keith Moffitt (Liberal Democrats, West End 1992–2002; West Hampstead 2002–14), Leader of Camden London Borough Council 2006–10.
 Thomas Morris (Conservative, King's Cross 1968–71), Magistrate; Mayor of St Pancras 1961–62.
 Henry Newman (Conservative, Frognal and Fitzjohns 2018–22), political advisor.
 Chris Philp (Conservative, Gospel Oak 2006–10), MP for Croydon South since 2015; Minister for London 2019–20; Parliamentary Under-Secretary of State for Immigration Compliance and Courts 2019–21; Parliamentary Under-Secretary of State for Tech and the Digital Economy 2021–22.
 Luisa Porritt (Liberal Democrats, Belsize 2018–22), MEP for London 2019–20.
 Flick Rea (Alliance, Fortune Green 1986–90; Liberal Democrats, Fortune Green 1990–2021), Leader of the Liberal Democrat Group, former Chair of the Local Government Association's Culture, Tourism and Sports Board and member of the London Arts Council
 Dame Jane Roberts (Labour, Castlehaven 1990–2002; Haverstock 2002–06), Leader of Camden London Borough Council 2000–05.
 Nadia Shah (Labour, Regents Park 2014–present), Mayor of Camden 2016–17.
 Roy Shaw (Labour, Grafton 1964–2002; Haverstock 2002–07), Leader of Camden London Borough Council 1975–82.
 Tulip Siddiq (Labour, Regents Park 2010–14), MP for Hampstead and Kilburn since 2015.
 Nick Smith (Labour, Kings Cross 1998–2006), MP for Blaenau Gwent since 2010.
 Derek Spencer (Conservative, Highgate 1978–82; Swiss Cottage 1982–83), MP for Leicester South 1983–87; MP for Brighton Pavilion 1992–97.
 Jock Stallard (Labour, Grafton 1964–71; Alderman 1971–78), MP for St Pancras North 1970–83; Member of the House of Lords and Lord Temporal 1983–2008 (his death).
 Paul Stinchcombe QC (Labour, Brunswick 1990–94), MP for Wellingborough 1997–2005.
 Laura Trott (Conservative, Frognal and Fitzjohns 2010–14), MP for Sevenoaks since 2019.
 Frederick Tuckman OBE (Conservative, Adelaide 1968–71), MEP for Leicester 1979–89.
 Piers Wauchope (Conservative, Adelaide 1998–2002; Belsize 2002–06), Leader of the Opposition on Camden London Borough Council 2000–06, interim leader of the UK Independence Party (UKIP) 2019.
 Alan Wood CBE (Labour, Kilburn 1982–90), Corporate director for Children and Young People's Services in the London Borough of Hackney 2006–15.

References

External links

Local authorities in London
London borough councils
Politics of the London Borough of Camden
Leader and cabinet executives
Local education authorities in England
Billing authorities in England